Luz Rodriguez may refer to:

 Luz Rodriguez (activist) (born 1956), Puerto Rican activist
 Luz Rodríguez (footballer) (born 1991), Mexican footballer